The Shadow Walkers or  De Schaduwlopers  is a 1995 Dutch film directed by Peter Dop. It is Dop's debut as a feature film director.

Leen and Albert are two brothers who follow people around randomly at night in a small town. Both are married to a sister that is related to each other and while they go on with their normal daily lives, the brothers follow people and note slight changes in people's behavior. Their name for the activity is walking shadow. The brothers end up following a Japanese tour group heading to Paris.

Cast
 Pierre Bokma ...  Leen
 Aat Ceelen ...  Albert
 Jeroen Willems ...  Stijn
 Marlies Heuer ...  Judith
 Lineke Rijxman ...  Paula
 Ariane Schluter ...  Serveerster
 Betty Schuurman ...  Margreet
 Jack Wouterse ...  Man met Koffer
 Han Kerkhoffs ...  Marco
 Dirk Zeelenberg ...  Frans
 Dennis Rudge ...  Amerikaanse Militair
 Jan Kruse ...  Schoonhoven
 Marie Kooyman ...  Vrouw in Bontjas
 Ferry Kaljee ...  Echtpaar in Snackbar
 Anke Van't Hof ...  Echtpaar in Snackba

Production
Filmed in the director's hometown of Deventer, the film is based on stories written by Dylan Thomas and Gianni Celati. Despite being filmed in Dop's hometown, not much of the town is shown. Musician Fons Merkies plays the film's jazz score while Fred van Straaten plays the trumpet. The cameramen were Jan Wich, Lex Wertwijn and Peter Brugman Rotterdam, whose work on the film was praised by Variety. Van der Hoop Film Productions in collaboration with Studio Nieuwe Gronden and ARTE produced the film. The Dutch Film Fund and the Deventer City Marketing Foundation helped finance the production. The Shadow Walkers premiered at the International Film Festival Rotterdam.

Reception
The film was a moderate success in the Netherlands. David Rooney of Variety called the film "lazily compelling" and said that the comedy is drawn out. The Dutch film magazine Film Krant reviewed the film. Mark Duursma of Trouw said that nothing in the film is important and that the director has a lack of expression. According to Film 1, there is no "driving storyline".

References

External links
 

Dutch comedy films
1995 films
1990s Dutch-language films
Films based on works by Dylan Thomas